Arbacia lixula, the black sea urchin, is a species of sea urchin from Europe.

Description

It is a medium-sized sea urchin, characterized by its deep black color and its hemispherical shape. All of its spines are roughly the same size (no "secondary spines"), and worn erected (never dishevelled when in the water). The anus on the top is surrounded by four plates forming an anal valve. The oral face is nearly naked, the mouth being surrounded by soft, dark-greenish skin.

This species can be confused with the purple sea urchin Paracentrotus lividus, but the latter is never really black (though often very dark), has more dishevelled spines of many lengths, covers itself with debris, has spines around the mouth and no anal valve, and does not live exposed on the cliffs.

Habitat and geographical range
This species can be found on the coast of the Mediterranean Sea and Macaronesian Islands (Azores, Madeira, Canary Islands), and less commonly, on the Atlantic coast of Western Africa and the Brazilian coast. 
It is found typically at shallow waters, at depths from 0 to 30 m, in rocky shores. It has a good resistance to hydrodynamism due to a good attachment strength to rocks.

Biology
This species feeds mainly on crustose red algae and small filamentous algae. In a marine reserve in the Mediterranean, its population increased by a factor  over 10 between 1983 and 1992, from eight to 100 individuals per meter2. High seawater temperatures are thought to favour this species. When it was excluded from an area of the reserve, the density of filamentous algae increased.

See also
 Arbacia spatuligera

References

External links
 Echinoids Excellent photo of the test the same site.
 

Animals described in 1758
Arbacioida
Taxa named by Carl Linnaeus